The following is a list of awards and nominations received by American actress and producer Sarah Jessica Parker.

She is most known for her role as Carrie Bradshaw on the HBO comedy series Sex and the City (1998-2004). She earned fourteen Primetime Emmy Award nominations for the show, winning twice.

Major Awards

Emmy Awards

Golden Globe Awards

Producers Guild Awards

Screen Actors Guild Awards

Critic Awards

Film Festival

Theatre Awards

Drama Desk Awards

Hasty Pudding Theatricals

Miscellaneous Awards

References

Parker, Sarah Jessica